The Anglican Diocese of Asaba is one of 12 within the Anglican Province of Bendel, itself one of 14 provinces within the Church of Nigeria. The current bishop is Kingsley Chukwukamadu Obuh.

Notes

Dioceses of the Province of Bendel
 
Asaba
Asaba